The Cyclo-cross Ruddervoorde is a cyclo-cross race held in Ruddervoorde, Belgium, which is part of the Superprestige.

Past winners

Men

Women

References
 Results

Cycle races in Belgium
Cyclo-cross races
Recurring sporting events established in 1988
1988 establishments in Belgium
Cyclo-cross Superprestige
Sport in West Flanders